A springer is an architectural term for the lowest voussoir on each side of an arch. Since it is the bottom-most element of the arch, it is where the arch support terminates at the respond. It rests on the impost or pier of the arch, that is, the topmost part of the abutment, from which the arch arises.

Notes

Arches and vaults